Cucujomyces is a genus of fungi in the family Laboulbeniaceae. The genus contain 14 species.

Species 
 Cucujomyces bilobatus Thaxt. 1918
 Cucujomyces celebensis W. Rossi & A. Weir 1996
 Cucujomyces curtipes Thaxt. 1917
 Cucujomyces cylindrocarpus Speg. 1917 (type)
 Cucujomyces diplocoeli Thaxt. 1917
 Cucujomyces elegans Speg. 1917
 Cucujomyces elegantissimus (Speg.) Thaxt. 1931
 Cucujomyces gonicoeli Thaxt. 1931
 Cucujomyces intermedius Thaxt. 1917
 Cucujomyces melanopus Speg. 1917
 Cucujomyces phycophilus A. Weir & W. Rossi 1997
 Cucujomyces reynoldsii Thaxt. 1931
 Cucujomyces rotundatus T. Majewski 1974
 Cucujomyces stipatus Thaxt. 1917

References

External links 
Cucujomyces at Index Fungorum
 

 
 Cucujomyces at Mycobank

Laboulbeniaceae
Laboulbeniales genera